U.S.D. Irsinese Calcio Matera was an Italian association football club located in Irsina, Basilicata.

History

Fortis Murgia Irsina 
The club was founded on 22 July 2009 when Fortis Murgia Irsina acquired the sports title of Azzurra Tricarico in Eccellenza Basilicata. In the 2009–10 season Fortis Murgia won this league and the Coppa Italia Eccellenza and was promoted to Serie D where it played its home matches in Altamura.

Irsinese Calcio Matera 
La Fortis Murgia lascia Altamura e diventa U.S.D. Irsinese Calcio. Il Matera scompare del tutto]</ref> On 16 December 2011 it was renamed U.S.D. Irsinese Calcio Matera.

In summer 2012 its sports title of Serie D was transferred to Matera Calcio and so it was dissolved.

Colors and badge 
Its colors were white and blue.

Stadium 
It played at the Stadio XXI Settembre-Franco Salerno, in Matera, which has a capacity of 8,500.

References

External links 
Official homepage

Football clubs in Basilicata
Association football clubs established in 2009
Association football clubs disestablished in 2012
2009 establishments in Italy
2012 disestablishments in Italy